Hellinsia urbanus is a moth of the family Pterophoridae. It is found in Puerto Rico and Guatemala.

The wingspan is about 14 mm. The antennae are whitish ochreous. The head and thorax are pale ochreous. The forewings are pale ochreous, slightly suffused with brownish ochreous. The hindwings and cilia are shining light brownish cupreous.

References

Moths described in 1915
urbanus
Moths of Central America
Moths of the Caribbean